Nanette Kay Laughrey (born 1946) is a Senior United States district judge of the United States District Court for the Eastern District of Missouri and the United States District Court for the Western District of Missouri.

Laughrey is best known as the presiding judge in the Miracle Cars case. She has a reputation as a stern judge who exercises complete control over her courtroom.  In 2017, she ruled against the right of citizens to film public officials and officers in public.

References

Sources

1946 births
Judges of the United States District Court for the Western District of Missouri
Judges of the United States District Court for the Eastern District of Missouri
Living people
People from Cheyenne, Wyoming
Missouri state court judges
United States district court judges appointed by Bill Clinton
University of Missouri alumni
University of Missouri faculty
University of California, Los Angeles alumni
20th-century American judges
21st-century American judges
20th-century American women judges
21st-century American women judges